Katlego Danke (born 7 November 1978), is a South African actress, radio DJ and TV presenter. She is of Tswana ethnicity. Danke is known for her extensive role playing on South African soap operas, Backstage, Generations, Gomora and Isidingo.

Early life
Danke was born on 7 November 1978 in the North West, having stayed her childhood in places like Mahikeng, Ga-Rankuwa, Mabopane, and Potchefstroom.

Career
Katlego was performing in theatre before getting into television. She obtained her BA in Theatre and Performance at University of Cape Town in 2001 and is renowned for stage performances in theatre productions such as Beyond the Veil, The House of Kalumba, The Town that was Mad, Crimes of the Heart, King Lear, Miss Tertiary Feel, Occupational Therapy Project, and the Opera performance of Macbeth. From 2002, she played a role on e.tv's Backstage. She appeared on Generations from 2006, receiving a best actress award from the South African Film and Television Awards.  She has also appeared in commercials for Vanish, Clover,  and Honda. She completed a diploma in Management Studies in 2010, with Wits Business School. In 2015, she landed the lucrative contract of brand ambassador to the international baby products brand Philips Avent.

In both 2006 and 2011, she was voted as one of FHM's 100 sexiest women in the world. In 2010 she was nominated for a YOU spectacular award for Favourite Actress. She was nominated Best Screen Villain in the Duku-Duku 2004 Awards, and Best Dressed Actress in 2009 at the South African Film and TV Awards.

In 2016, following her departure from Generations, Danke began playing a recurring role in South African soap opera, Isidingo. On the show, she plays the character Kgothalo.

Isidingo ended its 21-year run on 12 March 2020. Prior to Isidingo's conclusion, it was announced that Danke would have a starring role in Gomora, a new South African telenova on digital satellite and entertainment channel Mzansi Magic. In 2023 she took a maternity leave in Gomora because she is pregnant.

Filmography

Television
 What’s Bothering Marc Lottering
 7de Laan
 Backstage
 Elna Liebe in Afrika
 Gomora
 Generations
 Isidingo

Drama
 Beyond The Veil
 The House of Kalumba
 The Town that was Mad (based on Under Milk Wood)
 King Lear
 The Suit
 Miss Tertiary Feel

Awards and nominations
In 2010, Katlego received the best actress award at the South Africa film and TV awards (SAFTAS) for her character as "Dineo Mashaba" on Generations.

References

External links 

 Divas inc. interview
 https://okmzansi.co.za/10-things-dont-know-katlego-danke/
 https://www.news24.com/amp/drum/celebs/katlego-dankes-first-new-role-after-isidingo-revealed-20200310
 https://www.news24.com/drum/News/katlego-danke-opens-up-about-motherhood-20170728

South African soap opera actresses
Living people
1978 births
University of Cape Town alumni
People from North West (South African province)
South African Tswana people